La Mailleraye-sur-Seine is a former commune in the Seine-Maritime department in the Normandy region in northern France. On 1 January 2016, it was merged into the new commune of Arelaune-en-Seine.

Geography

Heraldry

Population

Places of interest
 The church of St.Mathurin, dating from the sixteenth century.
 The remains of a feudal castle.
 A chapel dating from the sixteenth century.
 Some Roman ruins.
 The twelfth century Torps priory.

See also
Communes of the Seine-Maritime department

References

External links

Website of La Mailleraye-sur-Seine 

Former communes of Seine-Maritime